Kate Dickinson Sweetser (1870–1939) was an American author known in her time for writing juvenile fiction and compilations.  She was born in New York City to Charles H. and Mary N. Sweetser.  Her great-grandfather, Samuel Dickinson, was one of the founders of Amherst College in Massachusetts; she was also the cousin of poet Emily Dickinson.

List of works

References

External links

 
 
 

1939 deaths
American women children's writers
American children's writers
Writers from New York City
1870 births